Bonsai Kitten was a hoax website that claimed to instruct readers how to raise a kitten in a jar, so as to mold the bones of the kitten into the shape of the jar as the cat grows in the same way as a bonsai plant. It was made by an MIT student going by the alias of Dr. Michael Wong Chang. The website generated fury with many people taking it as serious and complaining to animal rights organizations. The Michigan Society for the Prevention of Cruelty to Animals (MSPCA) stated that "while the site's content may be faked, the issue it is campaigning for may create violence towards animals". Although the website is now shut down, petitions are still circulated to shut down the site or complain to its ISP. The website has been debunked by several organizations including Snopes.com and the Humane Society of the United States.

Concerns about the website
On October 30, 2000, BonsaiKitten.com was featured as a "Cruel Site of the Day" on the website Cruel.com. When this attracted complaints, Cruel.com removed its links to BonsaiKitten.com. Afterwards, however, when links to the BonsaiKitten.com website then spread across the world, many concerned animal lovers sent complaints to the Animal Welfare Institute and the Humane Society of the United States. Animal welfare groups made statements saying that bonsai kittens were not real. The URL drew criticism, which caused the initial host, MIT, to remove it.

Description of the spoof

BonsaiKitten.com's pictures show kittens in jars, presented as real examples of the "lost art" as described on the Bonsai Kitten web page. The spoof, according to "Dr. Chang", is that the world increasingly sees nature as a commodity, so such a site may well be in demand. The spoof came to large-scale attention as the "cruel site of the day" for December 22, 2000, was continually heavily condemned by animal rights organizations, and after hundreds of people complained daily to them, they stated that even if Bonsai Kitten was a spoof it "encourages animal cruelty".

The webpage being featured on the cruel.com website was significantly controversial and it was quickly removed. Initial humane society statements decrying the website as "encouraging abuse" caused local investigation, along with an FBI announcement that it was to investigate the hoax. The prosecution of the site by the FBI was welcomed by animal activists, but decried by web authorities. The FBI backed up its investigating of Bonsai Kitten by using a law signed by President Bill Clinton in 1999. The attacking of the BonsaiKitten.com website had the effect of displacing the website, which found a new ISP two more times, before being permanently hosted on Rotten.com servers. Because the website is still kept on some mirrors, it continues to receive complaints from animal activists.

The furor over the site triggered by animal rights organizations has been offset by their continued statements that the site itself is a fake. They have been stating this since 2001.

Groups such as the Animal Welfare Institute and the Humane Society of the United States received hundreds of complaints. Animal welfare groups declared the site as fake but stated they did believe it was potentially harmful. Other animal rights groups stated that the site creates an atmosphere of cruelty to animals. There is no evidence that the site was anything more than satire. Numerous authorities have advised people to stop sending complaint forms via email.

The original bonsaikitten.com is mirrored by many sites. The nature and presentation of the sites content is such that many animal rights activists still take issue with the context of the website. Bonsai Kitten has been further updated from other servers, but infrequently and slowly, with recent additions to the site being research indicating that cat litter causes brain damage. The website states that this enhances the Bonsai Kitten art form's practical value.

The controversy started soon after the creation of the BonsaiKitten.com website. It was the object of numerous spam email pleas. These pleas relied on the audiences, often not knowing English, to spread them. Consequently, these petitions were often spread via the internet in non-English-speaking countries. Blues News also provided a link, which was shortly thereafter removed from the site, as complaints against the website's existence and its content began to surface.

See also

 Chain letter
 Comprachicos
 Foot binding
 Impossible bottle
 Square watermelon

References

External links
 www.bonsaikitten.com, archive of original site at the Internet Archive Wayback Machine.
 Bonsai Kittens - Snopes.com Urban Legends Reference Pages
 Yahoo Directory Urban Legends > Bonsai Kitten

Internet memes
Internet hoaxes
Humorous hoaxes in science
Fiction about animal cruelty
Urban legends
Fictional companies
Fictional cats
American satirical websites
Internet properties established in 2000
2000 hoaxes
Cats in popular culture
Photography forgeries
Forgery controversies
Shock sites
Black comedy